Deliver the Word is the sixth album by War, released in 1973 on United Artists Records.

Reception

The album featured two singles, "Gypsy Man" (severely truncated from the 11 minute album version) backed with "Deliver the Word" (US #8), and "Me and Baby Brother" backed with "In Your Eyes" (US #15).  A live version of "Me and Baby Brother" had been released previously on All Day Music (1971).  The title "H2Overture" is a pun on H2O, the chemical formula for water.

A 4-channel surround sound (quadraphonic) mix was also released for the album in the 8-track tape format (United Artists UA-DA128-H), featuring a different track order, a reprise of "H2Overture" with early fade-out, and an early fade-out of "Gypsy Man".

Cover art
The cover was printed using metallic silver ink on black, and the cover is textured, resembling black leather as used for the covers of Bibles (the album title being a phrase associated with the Bible).  A die-cut window in the lower left corner reveals part of the innersleeve which shows a human figure walking along a deserted beach with his head bowed.  The other side of the innersleeve shows the same picture, but mirror reversed, and tinted blue instead of orange.  When the cover is inserted the other way around, the window reveals an empty beach with sunlight (which, in blue, looks like moonlight) reflecting off the water.  The album design and photo is credited to Gary Sato, with Lee Oskar credited for cover concept.

Track listing
All tracks composed by War (Papa Dee Allen, Harold Brown, B.B. Dickerson, Lonnie Jordan, Charles Miller, Lee Oskar, Howard E. Scott), except where indicated.

Side one
 "H2Overture" – 4:38
 "In Your Eyes" – 4:22
 "Gypsy Man" – 11:35

Side two
 "Me and Baby Brother" – 3:30
 "Deliver the Word" – 7:48
 "Southern Part of Texas" (War, Jerry Goldstein) – 6:22
 "Blisters" – 2:21

Quadraphonic tape edition
 "Gypsy Man"
 "H2Overture"
 "Southern Part of Texas"
 "Me and Baby Brother"
 "Deliver the Word"
 "Blisters"
 "H2Overture (Reprise)"
 "In Your Eyes"

Personnel
War
Howard Scott – guitar, percussion, vocals
B.B. Dickerson – bass, percussion, vocals
Lonnie Jordan – organ, piano, ARP violins, synthesizer, timbales, percussion, vocals
Harold Brown – drums, percussion, vocals
Papa Dee Allen – conga, bongos, percussion, vocals
Charles Miller – clarinet, alto, tenor and baritone saxophones, percussion, vocals
Lee Oskar – harmonica, percussion, vocals

Charts

Singles

See also
List of Billboard number-one R&B albums of 1973

References

External links
 War-Deliver The Word at Discogs

1973 albums
War (American band) albums
United Artists Records albums
Albums produced by Jerry Goldstein (producer)